Force dispersal is the practice of spreading out soldiers and vehicles in an army. It is used to minimize the effects of collateral damage, such as from bombs and artillery, and increases the number of artillery rounds needed to neutralize or destroy a military force in proportion to the dispersal of the force. If a division doubles the area it takes up, it will double the number of artillery rounds needed to do the same damage to it. As more targets are spread out, more artillery and bombs are required to hit them all. It's also used on a squad level, notably in counter-insurgency, to minimize the effects of grenades, land mines, improvised explosive devices, explosive booby traps, and to a lesser extent  automatic gunfire. When individual soldiers are spaced apart, it's much more difficult for a single grenade to incapacitate them all. Force dispersal may also be used in urban guerrilla warfare and as a tactic by militias to combat military intelligence instead of collateral damage. In this use, breaking up into covert cells is meant to make it harder to eliminate the whole organization at once, and to reduce the damage when portions of it are discovered.

One famous example of force dispersal is the Swedish air force's Bas 60 and later Bas 90 system of spread-out bases.

See also
 Force concentration
 List of military tactics

References

Sources
 Dunnigan, James F. How To Make War, 2003, HarperCollins Publishers Inc., 10 East 53rd Street, New York, NY 10022.

Force dispersal
Military tactics